Adeleke Akinola Akinyemi (born 11 August 1998) is a Nigerian professional footballer.

Career

Club

Serdarlı GB
On 24 January 2015, Akinyemi signed for KTFF Süper Lig side Serdarlı GB. He played 13 matches in the league, scoring 10 goals. In total, he played 17 matches and scored 11 goals for the Turkish Cypriot side during the 2014–15 season.

Ventspils
In early August 2018, Akinyemi went AWOL, resulting in his club, FK Ventspils filling a missing persons report amid fear the player had been kidnapped. Akinyemi returned to Ventspils a few days later, 13 August, playing in their win over FK Liepāja on the same day.

Start
On 16 August 2018, IK Start announced the signing of Akinyemi, on a contract until the end of the 2021 season, from FK Ventspils. After scoring 3 goals in Start's 2018 campaign which ended in relegation, in the 2019 1. divisjon season opener he broke his ankle. He was sidelined for a long time and failed to break into Start's first team after that. The former top scorer did not manage any goals during a loan to Hamkam in 2020 either. Following a goalless league run in 2021, Start decided to release him after the end of the 2021 season.

Career statistics

Club

References

1998 births
Living people
Nigerian footballers
Real Sapphire F.C. players
Association football forwards
KF Skënderbeu Korçë players
KF Trepça'89 players
FK Ventspils players
IK Start players
Hamarkameratene players
Nigerian expatriate footballers
Expatriate footballers in Northern Cyprus
Nigerian expatriate sportspeople in Northern Cyprus
Expatriate footballers in Albania
Nigerian expatriate sportspeople in Albania
Expatriate footballers in Kosovo
Nigerian expatriate sportspeople in Kosovo
Expatriate footballers in Latvia
Nigerian expatriate sportspeople in Latvia
Expatriate footballers in Norway
Nigerian expatriate sportspeople in Norway
Latvian Higher League players
Eliteserien players
Norwegian First Division players